Palmela is an extinct and poorly attested Cariban language. Kaufman (2007) notes that it was phonologically divergent.

References

Cariban languages
Extinct languages